The Sukhoi Su-47 Berkut (NATO reporting name Firkin), also designated S-32 and S-37 (not to be confused with the twin-engined delta canard design offered by Sukhoi in the early 1990s under the designation Su-37) during initial development, was an experimental supersonic jet fighter developed by the JSC Sukhoi Company. A distinguishing feature of the aircraft was its forward-swept wing that gave the aircraft excellent agility and maneuverability. While serial production of the type never materialized and the configuration was not further pursued, the sole aircraft produced served as a technology demonstrator prototype for a number of advanced technologies later used in the 4.5 generation fighter Su-35 and current fifth-generation jet fighter Su-57.

Development
Originally known as the S-37, Sukhoi redesignated its advanced test aircraft as the Su-47 in 2002. Officially nicknamed Berkut (the Russian word for the golden eagle), the Su-47 was originally built as Russia's principal testbed for composite materials and sophisticated fly-by-wire control systems, as well as new airframe technologies.

TsAGI has long been aware of the advantages of forward-swept wings, with research including the development of the Tsibin LL and study of the captured Junkers Ju 287 in the 1940s. At high angles of attack, the wing tips remain retracted allowing the aircraft to retain aileron control. Conversely to more conventional rear-swept wings, forward sweep geometrically creates increased angle of incidence of the outer wing sections when the wing bends under load. The wings experience higher bending moments, leading to a tendency for the wings to fail structurally at lower speeds than for a straight or aft-swept wing.

The project was launched in 1983 on order from the Soviet Air Force. But when the USSR dissolved, funding was frozen and development continued only through funding by Sukhoi. Like its US counterpart, the Grumman X-29, the Su-47 was primarily a technology demonstrator for future Russian fighters such as the Sukhoi Su-57. The forward-swept wing configuration was ultimately not pursued because it was mainly advantageous at transonic speeds while an aft-swept wing was superior at supersonic speeds.

Design

The Su-47 is of similar dimensions to previous large Sukhoi fighters, such as the Su-35. To reduce development costs, the Su-47 borrowed the forward fuselage, vertical tails, and landing gear of the Su-27 family. Nonetheless, the aircraft includes an internal weapons bay, and space set aside for an advanced radar.

Like its immediate predecessor, the Su-37, the Su-47 is of tandem-triple layout, with canards ahead of wings and tailplanes. The Su-47 has two tailbooms of unequal length outboard of the exhaust nozzles. The shorter boom, on the left-hand side, houses ECM system, while the longer boom houses a rear-facing  radar.

Maneuverability
The Su-47 has extremely high agility at subsonic speeds, enabling the aircraft to alter its angle of attack and its flight path very quickly while retaining maneuverability in supersonic flight.

Wings
The forward-swept midwing gives the Su-47 its unconventional appearance. A substantial part of the lift generated by the forward-swept wing occurs at the inner portion of the wingspan. This inboard lift is not restricted by wingtip stall and the lift-induced wingtip vortex generation is thus reduced. The ailerons—the wing's control surfaces—remain effective at the highest angles of attack, and controllability of the aircraft is retained even in the event of airflow separating from the remainder of the wings' surface.

A downside of such a forward-swept wing design is that it geometrically produces wing twisting as it bends under load, resulting in greater stress on the wing than for a similar straight or aft-swept wing. This requires the wing be designed to twist as it bends—opposite to the geometric twisting.  This is done by the use of composites wing skins laid-up to twist. The plane was initially limited to Mach 1.6. Because the forward sweep was primarily beneficial at transonic speed while losing out to aft-swept wing at supersonic speed, it was not further pursued.

Thrust vectoring
The thrust vectoring (with PFU engine modification) of ±20° at 30°/second in pitch and yaw will greatly support the agility gained by other aspects of the design.

Specifications (Su-47)

Gallery

See also

References

Bibliography

External links

 S-37 Berkut at Fighter-Planes.com

Stealth aircraft
1990s Soviet and Russian experimental aircraft
1990s Soviet and Russian fighter aircraft
Abandoned military aircraft projects of Russia
Aircraft first flown in 1997
Canard aircraft
Forward-swept-wing aircraft
Relaxed-stability aircraft
Su-47
Twinjets